Kenya competed at the 2011 World Championships in Athletics from August 27 to September 4 in Daegu, South Korea.

Team selection

After the final day of the National Bank of Kenya National Athletics Championships, Athletics Kenya (AK) named 48 athletes for the competition.

Only a sprinkle of new faces made the provisional Daegu roster that is fronted by three Olympic champions (Asbel Kiprop, Brimin Kipruto, and Nancy Langat) and all the four gold winners (Abel Kirui, Ezekiel Kemboi, Vivian Cheruiyot, and Linet Masai) the country minted in Berlin two years ago.

Among the fresh names will be unheralded Hellen Obiri who caused the biggest upsets of the day when she scorched Olympic champion, Nancy Jebet Lagat at the homestretch in the women’s 1500m.  No field athlete made the Kenyan World Championships squad.

The following athletes appeared on the preliminary Entry List, but not on the Official Start List of the specific event, resulting in a total number of 47 competitors:

Medalists
The following competitors from Kenya won medals at the Championships

Results

Men

Women

References

External links
Official local organising committee website
Official IAAF competition website

Nations at the 2011 World Championships in Athletics
World Championships in Athletics
Kenya at the World Championships in Athletics